Dezdak (also known as Dezak, Dozak, Dozdāgh, Dūzak, and Duzdāgh) is a village in Rak Rural District, in the Central District of Kohgiluyeh County, Kohgiluyeh and Boyer-Ahmad Province, Iran. At the 2006 census, its population was 279, in 63 families.

References 

Populated places in Kohgiluyeh County